Alfred Herbert Hawke (7 February 1881 – 11 May 1958) was a British photographer and postcard publisher based in Helston, Cornwall.

Alfred Herbert Hawke was born at 11 Richmond Terrace, Lower Easton, Bristol, on 7 February 1881, the son of Richard Hawke and his wife Eliza. They married in Liskeard, Cornwall, and Richard was a cabinet-maker and is thought to have been a native of Helston.

Starting in 1905, Hawke created 8,445 cards in his career, mostly topographical views of the Cornish coast and that of north Devon.

References

1881 births
1958 deaths
Postcard publishers
English printers
Photographers from Bristol
People from Helston
20th-century English businesspeople